Grant Langston may refer to:

 Grant Langston (motorcyclist) (born 1982), South African former motocross world champion
 Grant Langston (musician) (born 1966), American singer-songwriter